Heroína may refer to:

 Heroina isonycterina, a fish genus in the family Cichlidae
 Heroína (1972 film), an Argentine film
 Heroína (2005 film), a Spanish film
 Heroina (band), a Yugoslav rock band
 Heroina (magazine), a Yugoslav and Croatian music magazine
 Heroína (album), by Colombian singer-songwriter Nina Rodríguez, released in 2017
 Heroína (ship), a privately owned frigate that was operated as a privateer under a license issued by the United Provinces of the River Plate (later Argentina) around 1820
 ARA Heroína, modern Argentine Navy destroyer
 the Spanish and Portuguese word for both heroine and heroin

Or see
 heroine
 heroin